NA-151 Multan-IV is a constituency for the National Assembly of Pakistan.

Election 2002 

General elections were held on 10 Oct 2002. Makhdoom Shah Mahmood Qureshi of PPP won by 76,606 votes.

Election 2008 

General elections were held on 18 Feb 2008. Makhdoom Shah Mahmood Qureshi of PPP won by 83,184  votes.

Election 2013 

General elections were held on 11 May 2013. Malik Abdul Ghafar Dogar of PML-N won by 81,830 against Makhdoom Shah mahmood Qureshi voice chairman of PTI votes and became the  member of National Assembly. PP201 also is one of constituency of Punjab assembly won by pml n Malik Mazhar abbas ran

Election 2018

By-election 2022 
A by-election was held on 16 October 2022 due to the resignation of Zain Qureshi, the previous MNA from this seat.

See also
NA-150 Multan-III
NA-152 Multan-V

References

External links 
Election result's official website

NA-148